Bob Swift (born November 29, 1943) is a former all-star offensive lineman in the Canadian Football League. The three-time All-Star played from 1964 to 1977 for three teams, mainly for the Winnipeg Blue Bombers.

Born in Shawinigan Falls, Quebec, Swift won the Grey Cup in his rookie season with the British Columbia Lions where he played fullback and rushed for 1,054 yards. He broke his leg during the Grey Cup game and never regained his form at a fullback, and was traded to the Toronto Argonauts and eventually became an All-Star offensive lineman.

References

1943 births
Sportspeople from Shawinigan
Players of Canadian football from Quebec
BC Lions players
Canadian football offensive linemen
Canadian players of American football
Clemson Tigers football players
Toronto Argonauts players
Winnipeg Blue Bombers players
Anglophone Quebec people
Living people